Ritankar Das is an American scientist and technology entrepreneur. He was the founder and CEO of Dascena, a healthcare-focused machine learning AI startup, and See Your Future, an education NGO reaching 75 million people worldwide. At 18, he was the youngest University Medalist (top graduating senior) in at least a century among over 6000 graduates from UC Berkeley. He has been featured in the San Francisco Chronicle, ABC News, Times of India and over 100 other media outlets around the globe. Das has written a book of poetry, Silent Moon and has been inducted into the YEGS Hall of Fame alongside Martin Luther King Junior, Sergey Brin and Condoleezza Rice. He serves as youth chair of the advisory board of the USA Science and Engineering Festival.

Early life and education 
Das graduated from Mission San Jose High School in Fremont, CA before attending the University of California, Berkeley. In three years, he completed his studies at UC Berkeley with a double major in bioengineering and chemical biology and a minor in creative writing. He is UC Berkeley's youngest University Medalist in at least 100 years, and is also the first Medalist ever from the Department of Bioengineering and first from the College of Chemistry in the last 58 years. He is currently an MSc candidate in Biomedical Engineering and a Whitaker Fellow at the University of Oxford, and has been admitted to the chemistry PhD program at the Massachusetts Institute of Technology.

Research 
Das began researching alternative energy sources at the age of 12 and continued this work at the Energy Biosciences Institute and the United States Department of Energy. His research work includes development of better solvents to break down cellulose for biofuels and finding new ways to grow nanowires for using in highly efficient solar cells. He conducted research on organic light-emitting diodes at Taiwan's Academia Sinica. Das also analyzed entries for the Presidential Green Chemistry Awards at the United States Environmental Protection Agency. He was recognized by the Smithsonian as a "Future Nobel Laureate", was named a graduate fellow of the National Science Foundation and is featured in an upcoming National Geographic documentary.

Dascena 
In 2017, Das founded Dascena, a healthcare-focused machine learning AI startup. Dascena’s machine learning research was funded by the National Science Foundation and the National Institutes of Health. 

In 2019, Dascena partnered with Danaher Corporation and the Biomedical Advanced Research and Development Authority to develop an algorithm for early sepsis detection. In 2020, Dascena announced a $50 million funding round. The Food and Drug Administration issued an Emergency Use Authorization to Dascena for its algorithm used to inform COVID-19 care. 

In 2021, the Food and Drug Administration issued a Breakthrough Device Designation to Dascena for its algorithm used to predict GI bleed risk. In 2022, Dascena developed an algorithm for identifying patients with pulmonary hypertension in collaboration with Johnson and Johnson. Dascena was acquired by CirrusDx in 2022.

UC Berkeley 
As a student at UC Berkeley, Das served as an Academic Senator and helped manage a $1.7 million budget. He founded a research journal, Berkeley Chemical Review, and formed a campus chapter of the American Chemical Society, served as a graduate student instructor and created a new DeCal course on chemistry internships. He is the youngest inductee of the Berkeley Wall of Fame, alongside Aaron Rodgers, Gregory Peck and Steve Wozniak

See Your Future 
Das is the founder and CEO of See Your Future, an education NGO that reaches 75 million people worldwide. The goal of See Your Future is to increase the access of underrepresented students, such as low income, minority groups and female students, to Science, Technology, Engineering and Mathematics (STEM) careers with the help of curiosity-based learning and new technology platforms.

Author and Poet 
Das has written a book of poetry, Silent Moon and has published poetic works in the Namjai anthology. He has also judged the Bay Area Youth Poet Laureate competitions. Das speaks four languages and has spoken to audiences of over 35,000 as the student commencement speaker at UC Berkeley and at TEDxRedmond. He is currently writing a book on education reform. This book includes contributions from Nobel laureates, U.S. cabinet secretaries, university presidents and Fortune 50 CEOs.

References 

Living people
1994 births
21st-century American inventors